Saint-Marcel-de-Richelieu is a municipality in southwestern Quebec, Canada in the Regional County Municipality of Les Maskoutains. The population as of the Canada 2021 Census was 507.

Demographics

Population

Language

Communities
 Saint-Marcel
 Lanoieville

See also
List of municipalities in Quebec

References

Municipalities in Quebec
Incorporated places in Les Maskoutains Regional County Municipality